Zach Sims (born 1990) is an American entrepreneur who co-founded Codecademy. He currently serves as the CEO of the company.

Biography 
When Sims was 13, he started to email manufacturers with the idea to build a waterproof iPod case.

Sims later entered Columbia University with the class of 2012, as a political science major.

During his junior year, he realized that most of the students did not have the skill set relevant to their job search. He also worked for GroupMe, founded by his college friend Jared Hecht, after seeing him demo the application at TechCrunch Disrupt in 2010. However, he was frustrated with the lack of effective programming courses. As a result, he decided to teach himself coding with the help of his friend Ryan Bubinski, who he met while working for the Columbia Daily Spectator. The two built the first version of Codeacademy to teach Sims how to program.

In 2011, Sims and Bubinski were accepted into Y Combinator's summer program. That summer, Sims launched Codecademy with Bubinski and dropped out of college, a year before graduation. In 2011, the startup was the runner-up of TechCrunch's Best New Startup awards, losing to Pinterest. During the first weekend of the launch, it attracted more than 200,000 users and had 1 million users by the end of 2011. As of 2021, Codecademy has a user base of 45 million.

In 2013, Sims was named one of the finalists of the Time 100. In 2015, Sims attended the World Economic Forum.

References 

Living people
Y Combinator people
Businesspeople in information technology
American chief executives
Columbia College (New York) alumni
American company founders
1990 births